Carol Wilson is a soprano.

Carol Wilson may also refer to:

Cully Wilson (1892–1962), Canadian ice hockey player
Carol Wilson (footballer) (born 1952), British footballer
Carol Wilson, founder of Dindisc

See also
Carol Espy-Wilson, electrical engineer